The Ontario Archaeological Society is a registered charitable organization promoting the ethical practice of archaeology within the Province of Ontario, Canada.  It is a public and professional society formed in 1950.  

The Society produces a peer-reviewed journal Ontario Archaeology.  Headquarters are located in the Ashbridge Estate in the east end of Toronto with regional chapters throughout Ontario.

Origins and Aims

The Ontario Archaeological Society was founded in 1950 as the joint project of a group of enthusiastic amateurs whose interest in "buried history" had been sparked by the exciting lectures of John Norman Emerson, Professor of Anthropology at the University of Toronto.

Major aims of the society include:

To bring together individuals interested in the practice, promotion and advancement of archaeology, particularly in the province of Ontario.
To encourage and assist every effort, both individual and collective, which tends to foster, elevate and advance archaeology in the fields of learning and culture.
To discourage illegal archaeological investigation and excavation.
To facilitate the exchange of ideas and information, and to encourage co-operation among all those interested in the study of archaeology.
To publish archaeological literature and site reports.*To stimulate the interest of the general public in archaeology.

Publications

The OAS publishes the peer-reviewed journal Ontario Archaeology bi-annually.

Chapters

 Hamilton
 Huronia
 London
 Ottawa
 Peterborough
 Thunder Bay
 Toronto
 Windsor

See also

History of Ontario

External links

 Ontario Archaeological Society

Culture of Ontario
Archaeology of Ontario
Archaeological organizations
1950 establishments in Ontario
Organizations established in 1950